The 4M quad 7.62mm Maxim anti-aircraft truck was a Self-propelled anti-aircraft weapon developed by the Soviet Union in 1938, based on the GAZ-AAA truck platform.

History
In 1928, Fedor Tokarev developed a quad mount for the 7.62×54mmR PM M1910 machine gun for use as a light anti-aircraft weapon, which was adopted in 1938 as the 7.62mm M.1931 4M ZPU. The 4M ZPU was mounted on a GAZ-AAA truck to create a mobile AA weapon.

Specifications (7.62 mm M.1931 4M ZPU)
Crew 3 (Commander, Gunner & Loader)
Elevation: -10° to +85°
Traverse: 360°
Gun Sight: Ring
Gun Mount: Rotating metal frame
Weight: 460 kg
Rate of Fire: 2.400 r.p.m.
Maximum Ceiling: 1.400 m
Maximum Ground Range: 1.600 m

Variants
Later versions of the anti-aircraft truck equipped the 12.7×108mm DShK machine gun.

The quad-Maxim mount was also used on the 4x2 GAZ-MM and GAZ-60 half-tracks.

References

Self-propelled anti-aircraft weapons of the Soviet Union
Military vehicles introduced in the 1930s